Goyenia is a genus of South Pacific intertidal spiders that was first described by Raymond Robert Forster in 1970.

Species
 it contains ten species, all found in New Zealand:
Goyenia electa Forster, 1970 (type) – New Zealand
Goyenia fresa Forster, 1970 – New Zealand
Goyenia gratiosa Forster, 1970 – New Zealand
Goyenia lucrosa Forster, 1970 – New Zealand
Goyenia marplesi Forster, 1970 – New Zealand
Goyenia multidentata Forster, 1970 – New Zealand
Goyenia ornata Forster, 1970 – New Zealand
Goyenia sana Forster, 1970 – New Zealand
Goyenia scitula Forster, 1970 – New Zealand
Goyenia sylvatica Forster, 1970 – New Zealand

References

Araneomorphae genera
Desidae
Spiders of New Zealand
Taxa named by Raymond Robert Forster